Das Tal der sieben Monde is an East German film. It was released in 1966.

External links
 

1966 films
East German films
1960s German-language films
Films about the German Resistance
Films set in Poland
Films directed by Gottfried Kolditz
1960s German films